Samford University is a private Christian university in Homewood, Alabama. It was founded in 1841 as Howard College by Baptists. Samford University describes itself as the 87th oldest institution of higher learning in the United States. The university enrolls 5,683 students from 47 states, 2 U.S. territories, and 19 countries.

History

19th century
In 1841, Samford University was founded as Howard College in Marion, Alabama. Some of the land was donated by Reverend James H. DeVotie, who served on the Samford Board of Trustees for fifteen years and as its president for two years. The first financial gift, $4,000, was given by Julia Tarrant Barron and both she and her son also gave land to establish the college.  The university also honors the Reverend Milo P. Jewett and Edwin D. King as founders. All four of these founders were enslavers. The university was established after the Alabama Baptist State Convention decided to build a school for men in Perry County, Alabama. The college's first nine students began studies in January 1842 with a traditional curriculum of language, literature and sciences. In those early years the graduation addresses of several distinguished speakers were published, including those by Thomas G. Keen of Mobile, Joseph Walters Taylor, Noah K. Davis and Samuel Sterling Sherman. In October 1854, a fire destroyed all of the college's property, including its only building. While the college recovered from the fire, the Civil War began. Howard College was converted to a military hospital by the Confederate government in 1863. During this time, the college's remaining faculty offered basic instruction to soldiers recovering at the hospital. For a short period after the war, federal troops occupied the college and sheltered freed slaves on its campus. 

In 1865 the college reopened. Jabez Lamar Monroe Curry, an attorney, former US Congressman and Confederate military officer, served as president from 1865 to 1868. He was committed to the cause of broader education, and supported expansion of normal school training. 

In 1887 Howard College's board of trustees accepted real estate and funding from the city of Birmingham, Alabama, and moved the institution there. Faculty who remained in Marion formed Marion Military Institute (MMI) on the old campus. MMI continues to operate in Marion.

20th century

In 1913, the college became fully and permanently coeducational. Howard College added its School of Music in 1914 and School of Education and Journalism the following year. The college introduced its Department of Pharmacy in 1927. At the time, it was the only program of its kind in the Southeastern United States. During World War II, Howard College hosted a V-12 Navy College Training Program, allowing enlisted sailors to earn college degrees while receiving military training. 

After the war, the number of veterans attending the college under the GI Bill boosted enrollment beyond capacity. The college moved to the Shades Valley in Homewood, Alabama. Construction on the new campus began in 1955. It opened in 1957. In 1961, the college acquired Cumberland School of Law, one of the nation's oldest law schools. 

In addition to the law school, Howard College added a new school of business and reorganized to achieve university status in 1965. Since the name "Howard University" was already in use by a  school in Washington, D.C., Howard College was renamed as Samford University in honor of Frank Park Samford, a longtime trustee of the school. In 1973, the university acquired Ida V. Moffett School of Nursing. Samford University established a study center in 1984 for students to study abroad in Kensington, England.  On September 21, 1989, a Samford University professor, William Lee Slagle, fatally stabbed one of his debating team students and escaped. Slagle was finally captured six months later.

In 1994, Samford's board of trustees voted to allow the board to elect its own members. This gave the university formal independence from the Alabama Baptist State Convention, but until 2017 convention leaders retained ex officio seats on the board, were consulted on trustee selection, and the new trustees were presented to the convention for affirmation.

Civil rights
As a private, segregated institution, Samford University was to some degree insulated from the activities of leaders and protesters of the Civil Rights Movement in the 1950s and early 1960s. The officers of the Samford Student Government Association challenged a segregated concert held on campus by the Birmingham Symphony by inviting as guests the student government officers of nearby Miles College, a historically black school.

Segregation by private universities was outlawed by the 1964 Civil Rights Act. Initially, the school's leaders declined to express their commitment to desegregation. For example, the university declined to apply for the NDEA Student Loan Program for 1965-66 because it would have to affirm desegregation. Cumberland School of Law faced the greatest immediate risk of losing accreditation. In 1967, it admitted Samford's first black student, Audrey Lattimore Gaston. The entire university proceeded with desegregation. In the fall of 1969 Elizabeth Sloan Ragland became the first African American student to live on campus. On June 1, 2020, the university announced the installation of a memorial honoring "the sacrifices of many African Americans for the mission and vision of Samford University even in days when their efforts were invisible or barely acknowledged" it specifically mentioned Gaston and an enslaved servant named "Harry" who died while saving students from the 1854 fire. A public dedication the memorial was held on February 15, 2022.

21st century
Andrew Westmoreland was appointed president of the university in 2006. That year, the Jane Hollock Brock Recital Hall was dedicated as part of the university’s fine arts complex. A new soccer and track facility opened in 2011, part of a decade-long expansion of new athletics facilities that included a tennis center, a basketball arena, a football field house and a softball stadium. For the 2016–17 academic year, the economic and fiscal impacts of the university on Alabama were $424.8 million, 2,424 jobs, $16.1 million in state income and sales taxes, and $6 million in local sales tax. In 2013, the university established a new College of Health Sciences, including Ida V. Moffett School of Nursing, McWhorter School of Pharmacy, the School of Health Professions and the School of Public Health. The dean of the nursing school, Nena Sanders, was named vice-provost of the new college, and after her retirement in 2020 the nursing school was renamed the Moffett & Sanders School of Nursing.  In 2013, the university announced the construction of a new facility to house Brock School of Business. In 2014, the West Village residence complex opened. That December, the university purchased the adjacent headquarters of Southern Progress, a subsidiary of Time, Inc., that houses the College of Health Sciences. 

The university ended its long financial connection with the Alabama Baptist State Convention in July 2017 when the trustees announced they would no longer accept funds from the convention. Later that year Samford and the state convention agreed that Samford would no longer present its slate of trustees to the convention for affirmation and that convention officers would no longer have an ex officio position on the board. This ended key aspects of Samford's formal connection to the state convention that had existed for decades. Still, by the trustees’ own rule, all trustees must be members of Baptist churches and 75% from Alabama. Samford is a collaborative partner of the Council for Christian Colleges and Universities. In August 2020, Westmoreland announced he would retire on June 30, 2021. On March 10, 2021, it was announced that he will be succeeded by Whitworth University president Beck A. Taylor. Taylor took office on July 1, 2021.

In May 2022, the university received a $100 million gift from the estate of alumnus Marvin Mann, making it the largest single-donor gift ever made to a higher education institution in Alabama.

LGBTQ rights
Samford has been involved in several well publicized incidents in which the university rejected LGBTQ+ students' requests to form student organizations or refused to work with Christian groups that were LGBTQ+ affirming.  In 2017, President Westmoreland rejected Samford Together, a organization that sought to create a space for students to discuss topics related to sexual orientation and gender identity “in an open-minded and accepting environment,” even though the organization had been approved by both the Student Government Association and the faculty  

Similar actions occurred again in 2022. In late August, Samford administration “uninvited” representatives of Episcopalian and Presbyterian campus ministries from a campus event because these ministries were affirming of LGBTQ+ individuals. In justifying the move, Vice President of Student Affairs Phil Kimrey stated, “Throughout its history, the university has consistently subscribed to and practiced biblically orthodox beliefs," and "the university has a responsibility to formally partner with ministry organizations that share our beliefs.” On-campus protests against the change included a silent vigil outside a university-wide worship service on September 20. On September 30, President Beck Taylor stated more explicitly in a video message that "we decided to limit Samford’s formal ministry partnerships to churches and to organizations that support Samford’s traditional view of human sexuality and marriage." This ended Samford’s nearly thirty-year relationship with Birmingham Episcopal Campus Ministries. In October, Taylor declined university recognition to a chapter of OUTLaw in Samford's Cumberland School of Law. OUTLaw is a national organization supporting LGBTQ+ law students.

Academics

Samford, a Christian university, offers undergraduate and graduate degree programs, with 170 undergraduate majors, minors and concentrations. The university is divided into the School of the Arts, Howard College of Arts and Sciences, Brock School of Business, Beeson Divinity School, Orlean Beeson School of Education, Cumberland School of Law, Moffett & Sanders School of Nursing, McWhorter School of Pharmacy, School of Health Professions, and School of Public Health. The faculty-to-student ratio at Samford University is 1:13. Approximately two-thirds of the university's classes have fewer than 20 students.

Campus
Samford has moved four times during its history. Originally, Howard College was located in Marion, Alabama, a black-belt town between Selma and Tuscaloosa; it was later the birthplace of Coretta Scott King. The college moved twice in the town. Its second campus is now the home of Marion Military Institute. In 1887, the college moved to the East Lake community in Birmingham. It is built in the Georgian Colonial style based on Colonial Williamsburg as envisioned by Lena Vail Davis, wife of then President Harwell Davis when the campus was moved to the Shades Valley area of Jefferson County in 1953-57. {https://www.samford.edu/about/history} The campus was designed by the Birmingham architectural firm Van Keuren & Davis, and most later buildings have also been designed by the same firm, known as Davis Architects since 1986.

In 1983 the university established a study center in London, England, to facilitate students studying abroad. Named the Daniel House, the center is located at 12 Ashburn Gardens in South Kensington and hosts 15-24 students each semester.

In 2014 the university purchased the campus of the Southern Progress Corporation which borders its main campus to the east. (The land had originally been part of Samford's undeveloped campus and was previously sold by Samford to Southern Progress.) The three huge buildings on the former Southern Progress campus are strikingly modern in their architecture and nestled among trees. This contrasts with the Georgian Colonial classicism of the central campus.

Student demographics
In 2020, Samford University enrolled 3,576 undergraduate and 2,153 graduate and professional students. Students from 47 states and 30 countries attend Samford, with 66 percent of the undergraduate student body coming from outside the state of Alabama. 97 percent of all May 2019 undergraduate alumni were employed or enrolled in graduate school or in internships within six months of graduation. 81 percent of May 2015 graduates completed an internship during their time at Samford.  During 2015, Samford students completed 716,902 hours of community service.

Athletics

The university fields 17 varsity sports and participates in the NCAA at the Division I level as a member of the Southern Conference. Men's sports include baseball, basketball, cross country, football, golf, tennis and indoor and outdoor track and field. Women's sports include basketball, cross country, golf, soccer, softball, tennis, indoor and outdoor track and field and volleyball.

In the NCAA's 2013 report, Samford student-athletes achieved an average Academic Progress Rate of 990, the highest in Alabama. It marked the eighth consecutive year that Samford has been a leader in APR measures, beginning in 2005 when it placed 7th in the nation in the inaugural ranking. The university is one of only 61 schools to have received an NCAA Public Recognition Award for academic excellence in the past eight years.

In 2019, Samford's athletics teams were ranked first in Alabama and the Southern Conference and 18th in the country among all NCAA Division 1 schools for Graduation Success Rate by the NCAA with an average score of 97%. Nine teams posted perfect scores. Samford is first among Division I schools in Alabama and in the Southern Conference. 
 
The Bulldogs have won 57 conference championships since joining the Southern Conference in 2008. In the last 20 years, 28 Samford baseball players have been selected in the Major League Baseball Draft, and 19 Bulldog football players have been chosen in the National Football League Draft. Past student-athletes include national-championship football coaches Bobby Bowden and Jimbo Fisher All-Pro defensive back Cortland Finnegan, NFL standouts include James Bradberry (Carolina Panthers), Michael Pierce (Baltimore Ravens) and Jaquiski Tartt (San Francisco 49ers), and baseball’s Phillip Ervin, who has had success with the Cincinnati Reds.

Notable alumni
The university has more than 52,000 alumni, including U.S. congressmen, seven state governors, two U.S. Supreme Court justices, four Rhodes Scholars, multiple Emmy and Grammy award-winning artists, two national championship football coaches, and recipients of the Pulitzer and Nobel Peace prizes. Some notable alumni include:

Politics and government
 Robert Aderholt (1990), United States Congressman from Alabama
 Andrew L. Brasher, United States District Judge (Samford University, Harvard School of Law)
 Benjamin Franklin Cameron, judge of the United States Court of Appeals for the Fifth Circuit
 Joyce Chandler,  former educator and member of Georgia House of Representatives.
 Charles Crist, former Florida governor, graduated from Cumberland School of Law
 Stephen Louis A. Dillard (1992), Chief Judge, Court of Appeals of Georgia
 Jim Folsom (non-graduate), governor of Alabama from 1947-1951 and 1955-1959
 Cordell Hull, 47th U.S. secretary of state (1933-1944), Nobel Peace Prize winner (1945)
 Jody Hunt (1982), United States Assistant Attorney General (2018-2020)
 Howell Edmunds Jackson, U.S. Supreme Court justice
 Lem Johns, U.S. Secret Service agent 
 Doug Jones, United States Senator from Alabama (2018-2021)
 Horace Harmon Lurton, U.S. Supreme Court justice 
 Nina Miglionico (1932), Birmingham City Council, 1963-1985
 Eric Motley (1996) State Department official
Michael Patrick Mulroy, Deputy Assistant Secretary of Defense for Secretary of Defense James Mattis
 Edwin L. Nelson, United States federal judge (Samford University, Cumberland School of Law - 1969)
 Kevin Newsom, judge of the United States Court of Appeals for the Eleventh Circuit
 Rusty Paul, 2nd Mayor of Sandy Springs, Georgia
 Stacey E. Pickering, State Auditor of Mississippi
 John Russell Tyson (1877), judge of Supreme Court of Alabama and U.S. Representative for the State of Alabama.
Janie Shores (1992), judge on the Supreme Court of Alabama, the first woman on that court and considered by Bill Clinton as nominee to the Supreme Court
 Randall Woodfin, mayor of Birmingham, Alabama (Samford University Cumberland School of Law)

Arts and letters
Mary Anderson, actress
 Zane Birdwell (2003), recording engineer
 Philip Birnbaum, author and translator of Jewish works
 Karen Fairchild & Kimberly Schlapman of the Country Group Little Big Town
Wayne Flynt (1961), historian
 Elizabeth Futral, opera singer
 Anne George, mystery author
 Tony Hale, TV actor
 Harold E. Martin (1923–2007), newspaper man
 Gail Patrick, motion picture actress and television producer
 Susan Patterson,  international opera star
 Jeanne Ellison Shaffer (2007), composer and musician
 Kristian Stanfill, Christian rock singer-songwriter

Religion
 Charles Billingsley, singer
 Cedrick D. Bridgeforth, United Methodist bishop
 Scott Dawson, evangelist 
 Adam W. Greenway, president of Southwestern Baptist Theological Seminary (2019-2022)
 Herschel Hobbs, pastor, Southern Baptist Convention president
 Derek LS Jones, Anglican Church in North America bishop
 David Gordon Lyon, Hollis Chair at Harvard Divinity School
 Andrew Manis, clergyman and civil rights historian
 Albert Mohler, president, Southern Baptist Theological Seminary
 Ed Stetzer, author

Sports
James Bradberry, professional football player
Bobby Bowden, second all-time winningest coach in Division I college football.
Marv Breeding (1952), professional baseball player
Phillip Ervin, professional baseball player
Cortland Finnegan, professional football player
Jennifer Pharr Davis, long-distance hiker and author
Jimbo Fisher, college football coach, currently head coach of the Texas A&M Aggies
Sam Goldman, professional football player
Devlin Hodges, professional football player
Slick Lollar, professional football player
Wendell Magee, professional baseball player
Michael Pierce, professional football player
Travis Peterson, professional soccer player
Marc Salyers, professional soccer player
Jaquiski Tartt, professional football player
Jeremy Towns, professional football player and physician
Montrell Washington, professional football player
Corey White, professional football player
Nick Williams, professional football player

Other
 Bubba Cathy, businessman, Chick-fil-A
John Crist, comedian
 Deidre Downs, (2002), Miss America 2005.
 Scarlotte Deupree, (2002), Miss Alabama 2002, 1st Runner Up to Miss America
 Amie Beth Dickinson, first runner-up to Heather Whitestone in the 1994 Miss Alabama pageant. When Whitestone was crowned Miss America, Dickinson was elevated to Miss Alabama.
 Melinda Toole, (2006), Miss Alabama 2006, 4th Runner Up to Miss America

References

External links
 
 

 
Educational institutions established in 1841
Universities and colleges accredited by the Southern Association of Colleges and Schools
Universities and colleges affiliated with the Southern Baptist Convention
1841 establishments in Alabama
Private universities and colleges in Alabama